Crocidiinae is a subfamily of bee flies in the family Bombyliidae. There are about 8 genera and 50 described species in Crocidiinae.

Genera
These eight genera belong to the subfamily Crocidiinae:
 Apatomyza Wiedemann, 1820 c g
 Crocidium Loew, 1860 c g
 Desmatomyia Williston, 1895 i c g
 Inyo Hall & Evenhuis, 1987 i c g
 Mallophthiria Edwards, 1930 c g
 Megaphthiria Hall, 1976 c g
 Semiramis Becker, 1912 c g
 Timiomyia Evenhuis, 1978 c
Data sources: i = ITIS, c = Catalogue of Life, g = GBIF, b = Bugguide.net

References

Further reading

 
 
 

Bombyliidae